This article contains the results of the Republic of Ireland national football team during the 1980s.

1980

1981

1982

1983

1984

1985

1986

1987

1988

1989

References

See also
 Republic of Ireland national football team 1970s results
 Republic of Ireland national football team 1990s results

1980s
1979–80 in Republic of Ireland association football
1980–81 in Republic of Ireland association football
1981–82 in Republic of Ireland association football
1982–83 in Republic of Ireland association football
1983–84 in Republic of Ireland association football
1984–85 in Republic of Ireland association football
1985–86 in Republic of Ireland association football
1986–87 in Republic of Ireland association football
1987–88 in Republic of Ireland association football
1988–89 in Republic of Ireland association football
1989–90 in Republic of Ireland association football